By All Means was an American male/female vocal group, consisting of James Varner, Lynn Roderick, and Billy Sheppard.

Their single "I Surrender to Your Love" was released on the Fourth And Broadway label, and entered the UK Singles Chart on 18 June 1988. It reached a high of No. 65, and was in the chart for two weeks.

Their self-titled album was also released on the Fourth And Broadway label, and it entered the UK Albums Chart on 16 July 1988, and reached No. 80; it was only in the chart for one week. They released another album in 1989 called Beyond a Dream and their final album on Motown Records It's Real in 1992.  This album scored the band one of their biggest American hits, "The Feeling I Get". However, they split up soon after.

Two of the members of By All Means, Lynn Roderick and James Varner, have a daughter also in music, Elle Varner. They both made appearances on her debut album Perfectly Imperfect as background singers, songwriters, and producers on a few songs.

Discography

References
 [ Allmusic]
 Discogs

External links
 Soulwalking page

Musical groups established in 1988
American contemporary R&B musical groups
Island Records artists
Motown artists